Travis Lamon Fisher (born September 12, 1979) is a former American football cornerback and current coach for Syracuse. He was drafted by the St. Louis Rams in the second round of the 2002 NFL Draft. He played college football at UCF.

Travis Fisher also played for the Detroit Lions and Seattle Seahawks.

Early years
Travis Fisher attended Godby High School in Tallahassee, Florida and won varsity letters in football and track. In track, he won state championships on the 100 meter dash, the 200 meter dash, and was a member of the 4×100 meter relay, which placed first at the state championship.

College career
At UCF, Fisher started 23-of-33 games and registered 130 tackles (91 solo) with four interceptions and 35 pass defenses. As a senior, he started 11 games and  finished season with 61 tackles, (39 solo), two interceptions, 13 passes defensed, and three tackles for  losses. The prior season, as a junior, started  11 games and finished season with 37 tackles (27 solo), had 11 passes  defensed, and two  interceptions. As a sophomore, he played in 11 games  with  onestart and ended year with 32 tackles and tied  for  team  lead  with 11 passes defensed. Fisher played one season at Coffeyville Community College (Kan.), where he  led team to number four national ranking in pass defense. He redshirted as a true freshman.

Playing career

Pre-draft
Fisher was timed at pre-draft workouts as having a 4.37 40-yard time, a vertical jump of 34½ and measured at 5-9⅞ and 188 pounds.

St. Louis Rams
He was drafted in the second round by the St. Louis Rams with the 64th overall pick of the 2002 NFL Draft. He signed a five-year, $3 million contract with the Rams. The contract called for a $1.15 million signing bonus. In his rookie season he played in 14 games and started 11, and recorded 67 tackles, 2 interceptions, and 14 passes defended. 2003 was his best year as he played in 15 games and recorded 75 tackles, 4 interceptions, and 12 passes defended. He returned two of his four interceptions for touchdowns (57, 74) and also tied for the NFL lead with 205 total interception return yards. In 2004, he  sustained a broken right arm in preseason game at forcing him to miss the first six games of the season. He returned to play and start in 10 games and finished season with 42 tackles (35 solo), an interception, a forced fumble and six pass defenses. In 2005, he was the starting right cornerback for eight of the first nine games. Missed five of six games before being placed on reserve/injured list December 14, 2005, with groin injury. In 2006 Fisher played and started in nine games for the Rams and registered 31 tackles (25 solo) and two pass defenses. He left the Week 10 game at Seattle (11/12) in fourth quarter with fractured right arm and was placed on reserve/injured list November 14, 2006. This was the second time in the previous three seasons he broke his arm.

Detroit Lions
He signed a one-year $2.25 million deal with the Lions March 13, 2007, as an unrestricted free agent. Fisher re-signed a three-year $9 million contract (with $4 million in guarantees) with the Lions on March 12, 2008, after recording a career-high 85 tackles during his first year with Detroit in which started 13 of the 16 games he played. In 2008, he had 39 tackles, two passes defensed after starting 8 of the 15 games he played. On May 1, 2009, the Lions released Fisher.

Seattle Seahawks
Fisher signed with the Seattle Seahawks on August 2, 2009. He was waived on November 2.

Baltimore Ravens
Fisher signed with the Baltimore Ravens on May 17, 2010. He was released on September 4.

Coaching career
Fisher has been a college assistant coach for nearly a decade, ranging from quality control assistant to defensive backs coach. He began his coaching career at UCF under Scott Frost.

Fisher was the defensive backs coach at Nebraska from 2018-2022 and at UCF from 2015-2017.  Under Fisher's coaching, nine of his defensive backs from 2018-2022 have signed NFL contracts, including junior college transfer Mike Hughes, who became an All-American and first-round NFL pick in one season.

In January 2023, Fisher was hired by the Syracuse Orange football team as defensive backs coach.

References

1979 births
Living people
American football cornerbacks
Baltimore Ravens players
Coffeyville Red Ravens football players
Detroit Lions players
Nebraska Cornhuskers football coaches
Seattle Seahawks players
St. Louis Rams players
UCF Knights football players
UCF Knights football coaches
Players of American football from Tallahassee, Florida
African-American players of American football
21st-century African-American sportspeople
20th-century African-American sportspeople
Syracuse Orange football coaches